Oakland is an unincorporated community located in Bracken County, Kentucky, United States.

Oakland most likely was named for a grove of oak trees near the original town site.

References

Unincorporated communities in Bracken County, Kentucky
Unincorporated communities in Kentucky